The 2018 CECAFA U17 Championship was the 3rd CECAFA U-17 Championship organized by CECAFA (Council of East and Central Africa Football Association)

Venues

Urukundo Stadium, Ngozi
Umuco Stadium, Muyinga
Ingoma Stadium, Gitega

Teams

Officials

On 6 April 2018, CECAFA released the list of 7 referees and 8 assistant referees.

Group stage

Group A

Group B

Zanzibar team was removed from the tournament for fielding over age players.

Knockout stage

In the knockout stages, if a match is level at the end of normal playing time, extra time is played (two periods of 15 minutes each) and followed, if necessary, by a penalty shoot-out to determine the winners.

Bracket

Semi-finals

Third place play-off

Final

References

CECAFA competitions
2018 in African football